Tasha Kheiriddin (born 1970) is a Canadian public affairs commentator, consultant, lawyer, policy analyst and writer.

Early life and education
Born on June 25, 1970, Kheiriddin was born and raised in Montreal and earned a law degree from McGill University.

Career
Kheiriddin began her career as a litigation lawyer for Spiegel Sohmer in Montreal where she practiced for three years.

After practising law in Montreal, she moved to Toronto, where she was legislative assistant to the Attorney General of Ontario. Kheiriddin was president of the Progressive Conservative Youth Federation of Canada from 1995 to 1998. She subsequently worked as a television producer at CBC Newsworld and a host and producer on the Cable Public Affairs Channel.

Kheiriddin was the Ontario director for the Canadian Taxpayers Federation for several years before returning to Quebec to join the Montreal Economic Institute, a free-market think tank. She then worked as the director for Quebec in the Montreal office of the Fraser Institute.

From 2011 to 2012, she hosted a Sunday afternoon talk show on Newstalk 1010 and then a business and politics television program, National Affairs, airing weekdays on CTV News Channel. She served on the editorial board for the National Post from 2010 to 2011.

She hosted The Tasha Kheiriddin Show on CFMJ in Toronto. She is also a faculty member at McGill University's Max Bell School of Public Policy and has lectured in politics at the university. In 2022 she served as co-chair for Jean Charest's bid for the Conservative Party Leadership.

Works
In November 2005 she co-wrote Rescuing Canada’s Right: Blueprint for a Conservative Revolution, with journalist Adam Daifallah. In 2022 she published The Right Path: How Conservatives Can Unite, Inspire and Take Canada Forward.

Recognition
The Canadian Bar Association recognized her in 2003 with the Justicia Award for Excellence in Journalism for her television program, Legal Talk.

In 2016 she was ranked amongst Canada's most powerful women by the W network. 

In 2012 she was recognized by the Montreal Economic Institute for her contribution to economic education in Canadian media.

References

1970 births
Living people
Canadian political writers
Canadian television hosts
Canadian television producers
Journalists from Montreal
Canadian women television producers
McGill University Faculty of Law alumni
National Post people
Progressive Conservative Party of Canada politicians
Writers from Montreal
Canadian women journalists
Canadian women non-fiction writers
Canadian women television hosts